Old Women's Buffalo Jump is a historic site and former aboriginal buffalo jump near present-day Cayley, Alberta. It is known by the indigenous name Aakíípisskan.

History 
Old Women's Buffalo Jump is believed to have been in use as a buffalo jump for approximately 2000 years, up to the late 1790s. It was used repeatedly as a site for hunting buffalo by stampeding them over a cliff. Archeological remains at the site show a build up of evidence at least six meters deep at the base of the cliff. The jump itself consists of Paskapoo sandstone cliffs.

The site of Old Women's Buffalo Jump is significant in Blackfoot legend as the origin location for the story of the first marriage between men and women, with the deity Nepi as a key figure.

Designation as historic site 
Old Women's Buffalo Jump was remembered in 1952 after the base of the cliff was eroded by flash flood, revealing remains of a buffalo jump. The site was recognized as a National Historic Site of Canada in 1960 because of its importance as an example of a buffalo jump. Official designation of the site includes 3.3 hectares around the jump, as well as the archeological remains at the site.

Archeological excavation 
The first archeological excavation at Old Women's Buffalo Jump was conducted by Richard Forbis in 1958–59, in conjunction with the Glenbow Foundation. In the first year, work at the site was directed by David H. Quapp and D. R. King, and in the second year by Tyler Bastien and D. R. King. This excavation revealed the presence of stone tools and arrowheads that had previously been undisturbed, and that give evidence to use of the site at various times back to at least 100 CE, and possibly as early as 1000 BC. Many types of arrowheads were found, including Besant, Washita, Pekisko, Paskapoo and Nanton points. The site also includes pottery, beads, and shells.

References 

Archaeological sites in Alberta
National Historic Sites in Alberta
Blackfoot Confederacy
First Nations culture in Alberta
Buffalo jumps